Mohammad Frieh (born 1 January 1988) is a Kuwaiti footballer currently playing with Kuwaiti club, Kuwait SC.

References

External links
 

1988 births
Living people
Kuwaiti footballers
Al-Arabi SC (Kuwait) players
Sportspeople from Kuwait City
Kuwait international footballers
Footballers at the 2010 Asian Games
Association football fullbacks
Asian Games competitors for Kuwait
Al-Sahel SC (Kuwait) players
Kuwait Premier League players
Kuwait SC players
Kuwaiti expatriate sportspeople in Oman
Kuwaiti expatriate footballers
Expatriate footballers in Oman